Peach County is a county located in the central portion of the U.S. state of Georgia. As of the 2020 census, the population was 27,981. Its county seat is Fort Valley. Founded in 1924, it is the state's newest county, taken from Houston and Macon counties on July 18 of that year. Its namesake is the peach on account of it being located in a peach-growing district.

Peach County is included in the Warner Robins, GA Metropolitan Statistical Area, which is included in the Macon-Warner Robins, GA Combined Statistical Area.

Geography
It is the fifth-smallest county in Georgia by area.

The majority of Peach County is located in the Lower Ocmulgee River sub-basin of the Altamaha River basin. A small portion of the northern edge of the county, north of Byron, is located in the Upper Ocmulgee River sub-basin of the Altamaha River basin. The very western tip of Peach County is located in the Upper Flint River sub-basin of the ACF River Basin (Apalachicola-Chattahoochee-Flint River Basin).

Major highways

  Interstate 75
  U.S. Route 41
  U.S. Route 341
  State Route 7
  State Route 7 Connector
  State Route 11
  Georgia State Route 42
  Georgia State Route 49
  State Route 49 Connector
  Georgia State Route 96
  State Route 127
  State Route 247 Connector
  State Route 401 (unsigned designation for I-75)
  State Route 540 (Fall Line Freeway)

Adjacent counties
 Bibb County - north
 Houston County - east
 Crawford County - northwest
 Taylor County - west
 Macon County - southwest

Demographics

2000 census
At the 2000 census there were 23,668 people, 8,436 households, and 5,997 families living in the county.  The population density was 60/km2 (157/mi2).  There were 9,093 housing units at an average density of 23/km2 (60/mi2).  The racial makeup of the county was 51.27% White, 45.37% Black or African American, 0.33% Native American, 0.33% Asian, 0.03% Pacific Islander, 1.83% from other races, and 0.84% from two or more races.  4.22% of the population were Hispanic or Latino of any race.

Of the 8,436 households 33.60% had children under the age of 18 living with them, 47.00% were married couples living together, 19.60% had a female householder with no husband present, and 28.90% were non-families. 22.60% of households were one person and 7.80% were one person aged 65 or older.  The average household size was 2.68 and the average family size was 3.14.

The age distribution was 26.00% under the age of 18, 14.90% from 18 to 24, 27.50% from 25 to 44, 21.70% from 45 to 64, and 9.80% 65 or older. The median age was 32 years. For every 100 females, there were 93.60 males.  For every 100 females age 18 and over, there were 89.80 males.

The median household income was $34,453 and the median family income  was $41,570. Males had a median income of $33,357 versus $24,440 for females. The per capita income for the county was $16,031.  About 15.20% of families and 20.20% of the population were below the poverty line, including 24.50% of those under age 18 and 13.50% of those age 65 or over.

2010 census
At the 2010 census, there were 27,695 people, 9,958 households, and 6,934 families living in the county. The racial makeup of the county was 48.3% white, 45.9% black or African American, 0.8% Asian, 0.2% American Indian, 3.2% from other races, and 1.5% from two or more races. Those of Hispanic or Latino origin made up 6.8% of the population. In terms of ancestry, 11.0% were American, 7.1% were English, and 5.8% were Irish.

Of the 9,958 households, 34.6% had children under the age of 18 living with them, 45.1% were married couples living together, 19.2% had a female householder with no husband present, 30.4% were non-families, and 24.8% of households were made up of individuals. The average household size was 2.58 and the average family size was 3.07. The median age was 33.3 years.

The median household income was $41,014 and the median family income  was $53,708. Males had a median income of $40,919 versus $29,328 for females. The per capita income for the county was $18,681. About 19.1% of families and 25.4% of the population were below the poverty line, including 44.6% of those under age 18 and 14.0% of those age 65 or over.

2020 census

As of the 2020 United States census, there were 27,981 people, 10,136 households, and 6,596 families residing in the county.

Education

It is in the Peach County School District. Peach County High School is the comprehensive high school.

Communities
 Byron (partly)
 Fort Valley (county seat)
 Warner Robins (partly)
 Perry (partly)

Politics
Since the 1990s, Peach County has been a bellwether, usually voting for the winning candidate in United States presidential elections. It has voted for the national winner in six of the past eight elections, only picking the national loser in 2000 and 2020. Before this, Peach County voted for the Democratic candidate in most elections during the 20th century, often by large margins.

See also

 National Register of Historic Places listings in Peach County, Georgia
List of counties in Georgia

References

External links
 Peach County government

 
Georgia (U.S. state) counties
1924 establishments in Georgia (U.S. state)
Populated places established in 1924
Warner Robins, GA Metropolitan Statistical Area
Majority-minority counties in Georgia